Copper(II) bromide (CuBr2) is a chemical compound. It is used in photographic processing as an intensifier and as a brominating agent in organic synthesis.

It is also used in the copper vapor laser, a class of laser where the medium is copper bromide vapour formed in-situ from hydrogen bromide reacting with the copper discharge tube. Producing yellow or green light, it is used in dermatological applications.

Synthesis
Copper(II) bromide can be obtained  by combining copper oxide and hydrobromic acid:

CuO + 2HBr → CuBr2 + H2O.

Purification
Copper(II) bromide is purified by crystallization twice from water, filtration to remove any CuBr and concentration under vacuum. This product is dehydrated using phosphorus pentoxide.

Molecular and crystal structure
In the solid state CuBr2 has a polymeric structure, with CuBr4 planar units connected on opposite sides to form chains. The crystal structure is monoclinic, space group C2/m, with lattice constants a = 714 pm, b = 346 pm, c = 718 pm, e ß = 121° 15'. CuBr2 monomeric units are present in the gas phase at high temperature. It forms bright green-blue solutions in water, and reacts with Aluminium exothermically: 3 CuBr2 + 2 Al forms 2 AlBr3 and 3 Cu.

Reactions
Copper (II) bromide in chloroform-ethyl acetate reacts with ketones resulting in the formation of alpha-bromo ketones. The resulting product can be directly used for the preparation of derivatives. This heterogeneous method is reported to be the most selective and direct method of formation of α-bromo ketones.

Dibromination of NPGs, n-pentenyl glycosides, using CuBr2/LiBr reagent combination was performed in order for an NPG to serve as a glycosyl acceptor during halonium-promoted couplings. 
Such reaction gives high yield of the dibromides from alkenyl sugars that are resistant to a direct reaction with molecular bromine.

Usage
Copper(II) bromide lasers produce pulsed yellow and green light and have been studied as a possible treatment for cutaneous lesions. Experiments have also shown copper bromide treatment to be beneficial for skin rejuvenation. 
It has been widely used in photography as its solution was used as the bleaching step for intensifying collodion and gelatin negatives.
Copper(II)bromide has also been proposed as a possible material in humidity indicator cards.

Safety
Copper(II) bromide is harmful if swallowed. It affects the central nervous system, brain, eyes, liver, and kidneys. It causes irritation to skin, eyes, and respiratory tract.

Natural occurrence
Pure copper(II) bromide is as yet (2020) unknown among minerals. However, barlowite, Cu4BrF(OH)6, is worth of mention.

References

Bromides
Metal halides
Copper(II) compounds